Psychotria chalconeura is a species of plant in the family Rubiaceae. It is found in Cameroon and the Democratic Republic of the Congo. Its natural habitat is subtropical or tropical moist lowland forests.

References

chalconeura
Least concern plants
Taxonomy articles created by Polbot